Bernd Strasser (born 22 January 1936) is a German water polo player. He competed in the men's tournament at the 1960 Summer Olympics.

References

External links
 

1936 births
Living people
German male water polo players
Olympic water polo players of the United Team of Germany
Water polo players at the 1960 Summer Olympics
People from Lüdinghausen
Sportspeople from Münster (region)